The Aberdeen Lock and Dam is one of four lock and dam structures on the Tennessee-Tombigbee Waterway that generally lie along the original course of the Tombigbee River.  It is located east of Aberdeen in Monroe County, Mississippi and impounds Aberdeen Lake.

References

External links
Tennessee-Tombigbee Waterway (U.S. Army Corps of Engineers)

Dams in Mississippi
Tennessee–Tombigbee Waterway
Buildings and structures in Monroe County, Mississippi
Crossings of the Tombigbee River